Antonio Narciso Flecha Álvarez (14 April 1912 – 6 January 1967) was a Peruvian basketball player. He competed in the 1936 Summer Olympics.

References

External links
 

1912 births
1967 deaths
Peruvian men's basketball players
Olympic basketball players of Peru
Basketball players at the 1936 Summer Olympics